Reginald Benjamin Desiderio  (September 12, 1918 – November 27, 1950) was a soldier in the United States Army during the Korean War. He posthumously received the Medal of Honor for his actions on November 27, 1950 during the Battle of the Ch'ongch'on River.

Desiderio joined the Army from Gilroy, California in March 1941. He is buried in San Francisco National Cemetery San Francisco, California.

Honors
The United States Army Reserve Center on Westminster Drive in Pasadena, California is named in his honor.
The airfield at USAG Humphreys (ICAO: RKSG) in Pyongtaek, South Korea, is named in his honor.

There is a memorial park dedicated to him in his hometown of Clairton, Pennsylvania containing a WW1 artillery piece and a 1950s missile. There is also a street named in his honor nearby.

Medal of Honor citation
Rank and organization: Captain, U.S. Army, commanding officer, Company E, 27th Infantry Regiment, 25th Infantry Division

Place and date: Near Ipsok, Korea, November 27, 1950

Entered service at: Gilroy, Calif. Born: September 12, 1918, Clairton, Pa

G.O. No.: 58, August 2, 1951

Citation:

Capt. Desiderio distinguished himself by conspicuous gallantry and intrepidity at the repeated risk of his life above and beyond the call of duty. His company was given the mission of defending the command post of a task force against an enemy breakthrough. After personal reconnaissance during darkness and under intense enemy fire, he placed his men in defensive positions to repel an attack. Early in the action he was wounded, but refused evacuation and despite enemy fire continued to move among his men checking their positions and making sure that each element was prepared to receive the next attack. Again wounded, he continued to direct his men. By his inspiring leadership he encouraged them to hold their position. In the subsequent fighting when the fanatical enemy succeeded in penetrating the position, he personally charged them with carbine, rifle, and grenades, inflicting many casualties until he himself was mortally wounded. His men, spurred on by his intrepid example, repelled this final attack. Capt. Desiderio's heroic leadership, courageous and loyal devotion to duty, and his complete disregard for personal safety reflect the highest honor on him and are in keeping with the esteemed traditions of the U.S. Army.

See also

 List of Medal of Honor recipients
 List of Korean War Medal of Honor recipients

Notes

1918 births
1950 deaths
United States Army Medal of Honor recipients
American military personnel killed in the Korean War
People from Clairton, Pennsylvania
Recipients of the Silver Star
Korean War recipients of the Medal of Honor
Burials at San Francisco National Cemetery
United States Army personnel of the Korean War
United States Army officers
Military personnel from Pennsylvania